Jan Koller is the all-time top scorer in the history of the Czech Republic national football team, with 55 goals in 91 appearances from 1999 to 2009. He officially became his nation's top-scorer on 8 June 2005, when he scored four goals in a 6–1 win over Macedonia in 2006 FIFA World Cup qualification, which took him to 39 goals, making him the country's highest scorer over Antonín Puč (who played for Czechoslovakia). He earned both his first cap and goal in 1999 during a 1–0 friendly against Belgium. He would go on to represent his country at 3 UEFA European Championships (2000, 2004, 2008) and the 2006 FIFA World Cup. They would only make it out of the group stage in UEFA Euro 2004, but get knocked out in the semi-finals to eventual champions, Greece. He would make his second and final retirement from international duty in 2009 after a 2010 FIFA World Cup qualification match against Slovakia.

Goals
Scores and results list the Czech Republic's goal tally first

See also
List of footballers with 50 or more international goals

References

Czech Republic national football team
Koller, Jan